Roman Jacek Kosecki (born 15 February 1966) is a Polish former professional footballer who played as a striker.

Career
In his club career, Kosecki played for RKS URSUS, Gwardia Warsaw, Legia Warsaw, Galatasaray, CA Osasuna, Atlético Madrid, Nantes, Montpellier, and the Chicago Fire. Osasuna transferred Kosecki to Atlético Madrid after the 1992–93 La Liga season, the second most expensive transfer of a foreign player in that window. After a successful year with Atlético Madrid and the Poland national team, Kosecki was chosen as the 1994 Polish footballer of the year by Piłka Nożna magazine. He came to Major League Soccer in the Fire's inaugural season in 1998, joining fellow Polish internationals Peter Nowak and Jerzy Podbrozny. Kosecki proceeded to score the first goal in Fire's history in a 2–0 win over the Miami Fusion. He then helped the club to the MLS Cup and U.S. Open Cup double. Kosecki played two seasons in MLS, scoring 12 goals and 19 assists in league play, before retiring as a player.

For Poland, Kosecki was capped 69 times, scoring 19 goals between 1988 and 1995.

He was a deputy (poseł) to the Polish Sejm from Civic Platform in 2005. Kosecki ran for the position of president of the PZPN in 2012 but lost to Polish soccer legend Zbigniew Boniek. Boniek however appointed him to vice president of youth development.

Personal life 
His son Jakub Kosecki is also a professional football player.

International goals 
Scores and results table. Poland's goal tally first:

References

1966 births
Living people
Polish footballers
Poland international footballers
Polish football managers
Legia Warsaw players
Galatasaray S.K. footballers
CA Osasuna players
Atlético Madrid footballers
FC Nantes players
Montpellier HSC players
Chicago Fire FC players
Ekstraklasa players
Ligue 1 players
La Liga players
Süper Lig players
Polish expatriate footballers
Expatriate footballers in Turkey
Expatriate footballers in Spain
Expatriate footballers in France
Expatriate soccer players in the United States
Polish expatriate sportspeople in Turkey
Polish expatriate sportspeople in Spain
Polish expatriate sportspeople in France
Polish expatriate sportspeople in the United States
People from Piaseczno
Major League Soccer players
Major League Soccer All-Stars
Gwardia Warsaw players
Sportspeople from Masovian Voivodeship
Association football forwards
Civic Platform politicians
Polish sportsperson-politicians
Members of the Polish Sejm 2005–2007
Members of the Polish Sejm 2007–2011
Members of the Polish Sejm 2011–2015